Quest of the Ancients is an independent role-playing game published in the late 1980s by Unicorn Game Publications.

Gameplay
It is mainly a Dungeons & Dragons clone, in that it was character class- and level-based, used a Dungeon & Dragons style Vancian Magic system, and used a skill system similar to the Advanced Dungeons & Dragons thief skill system.  Most notably, it used a thirty sided die (or d30) for combat resolution.

Written by Vince Garcia of Fresno, California, the game system implements a large number of character classes.

Reviews
White Wolf #28 (Aug./Sept., 1991)

References

Sources 

 https://web.archive.org/web/20080522202607/http://www.pen-paper.net/rpgdb.php?op=showline&gamelineid=267
 http://www.darkshire.net/jhkim/rpg/encyclopedia/alphabetical/P-Q.html

Indie role-playing games
Role-playing games introduced in 1982